Lachnaia pubescens is a species of leaf beetles from the subfamily Cryptocephalinae. It is found from North West Africa to the Iberian Peninsula, South France, Corsica and Sardinia.

References

Clytrini
Beetles described in 1820
Taxa named by Léon Jean Marie Dufour